The  were a class of two destroyers of the Imperial Japanese Navy.  The class is sometimes referred to as the Tanikaze class in some sources; however, Tanikaze was launched and commissioned later than Kawakaze.

Background
Construction of the new Kawakaze-class destroyers was authorized as part of the Imperial Japanese Navy's 8-4 Fleet Program in fiscal 1915. A large destroyer with long range, capable of providing escort to the new battleship  and the two s were considered a part of this reduced spending naval program from the previous Eight-eight fleet project..

Design
Initially conceived of as a follow-on version of the earlier s, however, it was the first to use the new Type 3 120 mm 45 caliber naval guns that were to be used many subsequent classes of Japanese destroyers. In addition, given the experience with deployment of Japanese destroyers for extended periods overseas in World War I, the hull and bow needed to be reinforced to handle heavy seas. Furthermore, the navy wanted to add the latest technologies in terms of the new 533 mm torpedoes in three double launchers.

It was furthermore decided to use the same Brown-Curtis heavy fuel oil fired geared steam turbine engines as on the Tenryū-class cruisers. The result was a ship was much more powerful that the earlier Isokaze class, and capable of high speed operation.

Operational history
The Kawakaze-class destroyers served during the interwar period. Kawakaze was retired on 1 April 1934 and Tanikaze a year later.

List of ships

References

Notes

Books

External links

 

Destroyer classes